Henllan is a village and community in Denbighshire, Wales with a population of approximately 750 (OfNS/2004) and lies in the countryside, approximately 2.25 miles (3.5 km) north-west of the walled town of Denbigh. The name is Old Welsh, Hên-llan, meaning "old church-enclosure". The population had increased to 862 at the 2011 census.

The Grade I listed country house, Foxhall Newydd, lies to the southeast. The country house retreat Eriviat Hall also lies outside the village. The Llindir Inn, reputed to be haunted, dates to the 13th century.

Church and bell tower 
The tower of Saint Sadwrn's church is unusual in that it was built separate from the main building housing the congregation. The stone tower, which is built on a rising rock, is sited at the highest point in the churchyard. It is thought this was to increase the range over which the tolling bells could be heard by parishioners. The traditional parish of Henllan covered a large area; today it forms part of the Benefice of Henllan, which includes the parishes of Henllan, Bylchau and Gwytherin.

References

External links 

www.geograph.co.uk : photos of Henllan and surrounding area
www.henllan.com/: Henllan Village Website maintained by the Henllan Community Council
www.henllanfootballclub.com/: Henllan Football Club website which is maintained by club members

Villages in Denbighshire